The 2017–18 Dynamo Dresden season was the 68th season in the football club's history and 2nd consecutive season in the second division of German football, the 2. Bundesliga and 7th overall. In addition to the domestic league, Dynamo Dresden also participated in this season's edition of the domestic cup, the DFB-Pokal. This was the 65th season for Dynamo Dresden in the Rudolf-Harbig-Stadion, located in Dresden, Germany. The season covered a period from 1 July 2017 to 30 June 2018.

Players

Squad information

Transfers

Summer

In:

Out:

Winter

In:

Out:

Matches

Legend

Friendly matches

2. Bundesliga

League table

Results summary

Results by round

Matches

DFB-Pokal

Squad and statistics

! colspan="13" style="background:#DCDCDC; text-align:center" | Players transferred out during the season
|-

|}

References

Dynamo Dresden seasons
Dresden, Dynamo